The Strona is a mountain torrent in the Province of Verbano Cusio Ossola, northern Italy, a tributary of the Toce. It rises from the small lake near Monte Capezzone at an elevation of <ref name=komp>Omegna - Varallo - Lago d'Orta, Kompass map 1:50.000 scale nr.97</ref> and runs through the Valle Strona (the communes of Valstrona, Massiola, Quarna Sopra, Loreglia, Germagno, Omegna, Casale Corte Cerro and Gravellona Toce) before entering the Toce. At Omegna it is joined by the Nigoglia, the outlet of Lago d’Orta.

SourcesThis original version of this article included text translated from its counterpart in the Italian Wikipedia.''

Rivers of Italy
Rivers of the Province of Verbano-Cusio-Ossola
Rivers of the Alps